ERC or Erc may refer to:

Education 
 Education and Research Consortium, an American educational organization
 Eleanor Roosevelt College, of the University of California San Diego
 NIOSH Education and Research Centers, of the United States National Institute for Occupational Safety and Health
 Emotion recognition in conversation, a research field to detect emotions from human conversation.

Games and sports 
 Component ERA, a baseball statistic
 European Rally Championship
 European Rugby Cup
 FIA European Rallycross Championship

People 
 Erc of Dalriada, king of Dál Riata until 474
 Erc of Slane (died 514), Irish saint
 Erc mac Cairpri, a character from the Ulster Cycle

Science and technology 
 ERC (software), an IRC client
 Easily recognizable code, in the North American Numbering Plan
 Electrical rule check
 Electrochemical reduction of carbon dioxide
 Electronics Research Center, a defunct NASA research facility
 Energy release component of a fire
 Epithelial reticular cell
 Epitopoietic Research Corporation - ERC Immunotherapy
 ERMC (cable system), a Eurasian telecommunications system
 Error recovery control
 Ethereum Request for Comments
 European Research Council, a European Union funding body for science
 European Rover Challenge, a robotics competition
 Extrachromosomal rDNA circle
 Panhard ERC, a French armoured fighting vehicle
 Engineering Research Center, a defunct Western Electric subsidiary in Princeton, New Jersey

Other uses 
 ERC (human resources organization), US
 Earnings response coefficient
 Edmund Rice Camps, an Australian children's charity
 Electoral Reform Coalition, in New Zealand
 Ethics Resource Center, US
 European Referendum Campaign, advocating referendums
 European Resuscitation Council, for resuscitation medicine 
 Republican Left of Catalonia, a political party in Spain
 Employee Relocation Council or Worldwide ERC
 East Renfrewshire Council, Scotland